Beatrice Shilling  (8 March 1909 – 18 November 1990) was a British aeronautical engineer, motorcycle racer and sports car racer. In 1949, Shilling was made an Officer of the Order of the British Empire.

During the Second World War Shilling designed the RAE-Hobson injection carburettor which overcame the problem of the Rolls-Royce Merlin aeroplane engines losing power during negative-g manoeuvres. Shilling also worked on the Blue Streak missile, researched the effect of a wet runway upon braking, and helped design and build a bobsled for the Royal Air Force's Olympic team.

In sports car racing, she scored several podium finishes at the Goodwood Circuit Members' Meetings.

Early life

Shilling was born at Waterlooville, Hampshire, the daughter of Henry Shilling (1852–1936), a butcher, and his wife Annie (Nancy), née Dulake (1873–1954). As a child Shilling spent her pocket money on hand tools and won a prize in a national Meccano contest. At 14 she bought herself a motorcycle, following which she taught herself how to disassemble and reassemble its two-stroke engine; she was already determined to become an engineer.

After completing secondary school she worked for an electrical engineering company for three years, installing wiring and generators. Her employer, Margaret Partridge, encouraged her to study electrical engineering at the Victoria University of Manchester; in 1932, alongside Sheila McGuffie, she received a bachelor's degree and then studied for a further year to get a Master of Science degree in mechanical engineering.

Jobs were hard to find in the Great Depression; she worked as a research assistant for Professor G. F. Mucklow at the University of Birmingham. In 1936 she was recruited as a scientific officer by the Royal Aircraft Establishment (RAE), the research and development agency of the Royal Air Force (RAF) in Farnborough, Hampshire. Her first position was as a technical author with the Air Ministry's technical publications department. She was allowed to transfer to doing work on aircraft engines. On 1 November 1939 she was promoted to become technical officer in charge of carburettor research and development and later promoted again to principal technical officer. 

Even as a senior member of staff she was respected by the factory workers for her hands-on skills, such as brazing a copper butt-joint with the skills of a dedicated fitter.

Royal Aircraft Establishment 

Shilling worked on many projects for the Royal Aircraft Establishment (RAE) during the Second World War, the most well-known of which was the RAE-Hobson injection carburettor modification (also known as Miss Shilling's Orifice) that solved the problem of Rolls-Royce Merlin engines stalling during negative-g flight.

RAE-Hobson injection carburettor 

During the Battle of France and Battle of Britain in 1940, RAF pilots discovered a serious problem in fighter planes with Rolls-Royce Merlin engines, such as the Hurricane and Spitfire. When the plane went nose-down to begin a dive the resulting negative g-force would flood the engine's carburettor, causing the engine to stall. German fighters used fuel injection engines and did not have this problem. So in action a German fighter could evade a pursuing RAF fighter by flying a negative g manoeuvre which the RAF plane could not follow.

Shilling devised a restrictor plate to solve this problem. It was a brass thimble with a hole in the middle (later further simplified to a flat washer), which could be fitted into the engine's carburettor without taking the aircraft out of service. The restrictor limited maximum fuel flow and prevented flooding. By March 1941 she had led a small team on a tour of RAF fighter stations, installing the devices in their Merlin engines. The restrictor was immensely popular with pilots and the device was nicknamed Miss Shilling's orifice (an inaccurate nickname, since Shilling was married three years prior and therefore her legal name was "Mrs Naylor") by Sir Stanley Hooker, the engineer who led supercharger development at Rolls-Royce at the time. It continued in use as a stop-gap until the introduction of the pressure carburettor in 1943.

Post-Second World War 

After the war, Shilling worked on a variety of projects including the Blue Streak missile and the effect of a wet runway upon braking. Shilling also helped design and build a bobsled for the Royal Air Force Olympic team.

Shilling worked for the RAE until her retirement in 1969, working as an engineer in the Mechanical Engineering Department. Despite becoming an Officer of the Order of the British Empire in 1949, Shilling never reached a top post in the RAE, since such promotions were only offered to men.

Motorsport

In the 1930s, Shilling raced motorbikes. After winning a race at the Brooklands racetrack on a motorcycle she modified herself, in a job interview she encountered the sexist comment of "I suppose the men let you win" from the interviewer. She was only the second woman to achieve this, the first being Florence Blenkiron earlier the same year. Both were awarded the British Motorcycle Racing Club's Gold Star award.  

After the Second World War Beatrice and husband George turned to racing cars, which were tuned and modified extensively in their home workshop - starting off their exploits with a much-lightened 1934 Lagonda Rapier registered KG 5363. Between 1959 and 1962 they raced an Austin-Healey Sebring Sprite 888 HPA, most frequently at Goodwood Members' Meetings, scoring a number of third places and even one race win.

Beatrice's and George's driving ambitions became more serious with the 1961 acquisition of an Elva 200 Formula Junior single-seater, but there were accidents for both of them, and the Elva was converted into a Mk VI sports car.

In 1967 Shilling was brought in to help Dan Gurney solve overheating problems with his Eagle Mk1 Formula 1 racing car.

Recognition and discrimination 

Shilling was awarded an honour as an Officer of the Order of the British Empire by King George VI in 1949.

In 1956, Shilling joined the Institution of Mechanical Engineers under her married name of Naylor, and was elected as an Associate Member, enabling her to use the letters CEng (for Chartered Engineer) after her name. In her application she outlined her contribution to the R.A.E. restrictor.

Shilling held an honorary doctorate from the University of Surrey awarded in 1969. She was a member of the Women's Engineering Society, which she joined as a teenager.

Shilling encountered various forms of discrimination throughout her career, including an RAE chief engineer who did not allow women to enter the building, a law prohibiting women from working at night, and a ban on women entering the RAE Senior Mess (club and dining hall). In a 2011 review of her biography, reviewer Graham White commented on her appearance as "in fact she looked pretty awful" and "she looked like a frumpy old British housewife".

Personal life

Shilling married George Naylor in September 1938. He also worked at the RAE. According to anecdote, she refused to marry him until he also had been awarded the Brooklands Gold Star for lapping the circuit at over 100 mph. During the Second World War, he was a bomber pilot with No. 625 Squadron RAF, reached the rank of Flight Lieutenant and was awarded the Distinguished Flying Cross (DFC). He volunteered for an extra tour of bombing missions, over and above what was expected of him. He suffered tinnitus and other health problems in later life as a result of his wartime activities.

Legacy

In 2011, the Wetherspoon chain of public houses opened a pub in Farnborough named the Tilly Shilling in her honour. In 2015, a collection of her racing badges and trophies was bought by the Brooklands Museum.

In September 2018, Shilling was included in Winchester Heritage Open Days 'Extraordinary Women of Hampshire' exhibition, which celebrated notable Hampshire women, past and present. On the 110th anniversary of Shilling's birth, 8 March 2019, the Mayor of Waterlooville unveiled a plaque at Waterlooville Library to commemorate her achievements.

On 27 March 2019, Royal Holloway University opened the Beatrice Shilling Building, home to its new department of Electronic Engineering.

In March 2020, Havant Borough Council announced the unveiling of a memorial plaque by The Mayor of Havant, Councillor Diana Patrick, at Shilling Place, Waterlooville on Monday 9 March – the day after Beatrice's birthday and International Women's Day.

Shilling's biography was published by the Oxford Dictionary of National Biography on 9 May 2019 as part of their support for the Women's Engineering Society's centenary.

Coventry University's Beatrice Shilling building opened on the city centre campus in Autumn 2020.

References

Bibliography 

 Lumsden, Alec. British Piston Engines and their Aircraft. Marlborough, Wiltshire: Airlife Publishing, 2003. .
 

1909 births
1990 deaths
Women inventors
People from Waterlooville
Alumni of the Victoria University of Manchester
English aerospace engineers
English motorcycle racers
Officers of the Order of the British Empire
British women engineers
British women in World War II
Alumni of the University of Surrey
20th-century British inventors
Women's Engineering Society